Shane Derrick Roller (born July 14, 1979) is a retired American mixed martial artist who is perhaps best known in his career for competing as a Lightweight for the UFC and WEC.

Background
Roller was born and raised in Bixby, Oklahoma along with his three brothers. Roller is known as one of the most decorated athletes in his state's history, a standout at Bixby High School while competing in wrestling, baseball, and football, lettering in each, and was the Tulsa World's 1998 Male Athlete of the Year. In baseball, he was a two-time letterman, playing shortstop, hitting in the lead-off spot, and was twice selected for the All-Metro Honorable Mention Team. In football, Roller played quarterback, running back, free safety, and was a three-time letterman. Roller was selected to play in the Jim Thorpe All-Star Game and was also selected as the 1997 Oklahoma Football Coaches Association All-Star Running Back. In wrestling, Roller was his high school's first four-time state champion and was twice selected as the Most Outstanding Wrestler at the state tournament. He compiled a 141-3 record and was selected for the All-State team, being voted the Most Outstanding Wrestler at the All-State match. He was also an Asics First Team All-American and received the Junior Hodge Award which is given to the nation's most dominant high school wrestler. Roller also received the Dave Schultz award which is for academic and athletic excellence, as he was also his class' salutatorian and a member of the National Honor Society. He received a scholarship to continue competing in wrestling for Oklahoma State University and was a three-time NCAA All-American, three-time Academic All-American, and Big 12 Champion. Roller was also the captain of the 2003 NCAA Championship team, and earned a bachelor's degree in psychology. He later earned his master's degree from the school while working as an assistant coach, earning three NCAA championships.

Mixed martial arts career

Early career
Roller made his professional mixed martial arts debut in 2007 and compiled a record of 3-1 before being signed by the WEC.

World Extreme Cagefighting
Roller made his WEC debut defeating Todd Moore at WEC 35 via submission (guillotine choke) at 3:00 of the first round. This was followed by another first round submission win over previously undefeated Mike Budnik at WEC 37.

Roller faced future UFC Lightweight Champion Benson Henderson on April 5, 2009 at WEC 40. He lost the fight via TKO due to punches in the first round.

Roller rebounded from his loss to Henderson defeating former Lightweight title challenger Marcus Hicks via unanimous decision on August 9, 2009 at WEC 42.

Roller defeated Danny Castillo on November 18, 2009 at WEC 44 via submission in the third round, earning Submission of the Night honors.

Roller faced Anthony Njokuani on April 24, 2010 at WEC 48. He won the fight via first-round rear-naked choke submission.

Roller faced Anthony Pettis on August 18, 2010 at WEC 50. Following a back and forth battle, the visibly exhausted Roller was submitted by Pettis via triangle choke with seconds left in the bout.

Roller faced former WEC Lightweight Champion Jamie Varner on December 16, 2010 at WEC 53. He won via submission in the first round.

Ultimate Fighting Championship
In October 2010, World Extreme Cagefighting merged with the Ultimate Fighting Championship. As part of the merger, all WEC fighters were transferred to the UFC.

Roller defeated Thiago Tavares via second round KO on March 3, 2011 at UFC Live: Sanchez vs. Kampmann, earning Knockout of the Night honors.

In his second UFC fight, Roller faced Melvin Guillard on July 2, 2011 at UFC 132. He lost the fight via KO in the first round.

Roller faced T. J. Grant on October 1, 2011 at UFC on Versus 6.  Roller lost via controversial armbar submission in round 3.

Roller faced Michael Johnson on January 28, 2012 at UFC on Fox 2, replacing an injured Cody McKenzie. Roller lost via unanimous decision (29-28, 29-28, 29-28).

Roller defeated John Alessio on July 7, 2012 at UFC 148 via unanimous decision.

Roller was expected to face Jacob Volkmann on September 1, 2012 at UFC 151.  However, after UFC 151 was cancelled, Roller/Volkmann was rescheduled and instead took place on October 5, 2012 at UFC on FX 5. Roller was taken down early in the fight and eventually submitted via rear naked choke. Shortly after the event Shane announced his retirement from mixed martial arts competition.

Personal life
Shane is married to Jennifer Roller and the couple have four children. Roller's three brothers, Keith, Mike, and Jimmy all played sports at the collegiate level. Keith played football, while Mike and Jimmy wrestled. Shane began Wrestling after he was bullied in the 2nd grade for letting flatulence slip.

Mixed martial arts record

|-
| Loss
| align=center| 11–7
| Jacob Volkmann
| Submission (rear naked choke)
| UFC on FX: Browne vs. Bigfoot
| 
| align=center| 1
| align=center| 2:38
| Minneapolis, Minnesota, United States
| 
|-
| Win
| align=center| 11–6
| John Alessio
| Decision (unanimous)
| UFC 148
| 
| align=center| 3
| align=center| 5:00
| Las Vegas, Nevada, United States
| 
|-
| Loss
| align=center| 10–6
| Michael Johnson
| Decision (unanimous)
| UFC on Fox: Evans vs. Davis
| 
| align=center| 3
| align=center| 5:00
| Chicago, Illinois, United States
| 
|-
| Loss
| align=center| 10–5
| T. J. Grant
| Submission (armbar)
| UFC Live: Cruz vs. Johnson
| 
| align=center| 3
| align=center| 2:12
| Washington, D.C. United States
| 
|-
| Loss
| align=center| 10–4
| Melvin Guillard
| KO (punches)
| UFC 132
| 
| align=center| 1
| align=center| 2:12
| Las Vegas, Nevada, United States
| 
|-
| Win
| align=center| 10–3
| Thiago Tavares
| KO (punches)
| UFC Live: Sanchez vs. Kampmann
| 
| align=center| 2
| align=center| 1:28
| Louisville, Kentucky, United States
| 
|-
| Win
| align=center| 9–3
| Jamie Varner
| Submission (rear-naked choke)
| WEC 53
| 
| align=center| 1
| align=center| 3:55
| Glendale, Arizona, United States
| 
|-
| Loss
| align=center| 8–3
| Anthony Pettis
| Submission  (triangle choke)
| WEC 50
| 
| align=center| 3
| align=center| 4:51
| Las Vegas, Nevada, United States
| 
|-
| Win
| align=center| 8–2
| Anthony Njokuani
| Submission (rear-naked choke)
| WEC 48
| 
| align=center| 1
| align=center| 3:07
| Sacramento, California, United States
| 
|-
| Win
| align=center| 7–2
| Danny Castillo
| Submission (rear-naked choke)
| WEC 44
| 
| align=center| 3
| align=center| 3:32
| Las Vegas, Nevada, United States
| 
|-
| Win
| align=center| 6–2
| Marcus Hicks
| Decision (unanimous)
| WEC 42
| 
| align=center| 3
| align=center| 5:00
| Las Vegas, Nevada, United States
| 
|-
| Loss
| align=center| 5–2
| Benson Henderson
| TKO (punches)
| WEC 40
| 
| align=center| 1
| align=center| 1:41
| Chicago, Illinois, United States
| 
|-
| Win
| align=center| 5–1
| Mike Budnik
| Submission (guillotine choke)
| WEC 37
| 
| align=center| 1
| align=center| 1:01
| Las Vegas, Nevada, United States
| 
|-
| Win
| align=center| 4–1
| Todd Moore
| Submission (guillotine choke)
| WEC 35
| 
| align=center| 1
| align=center| 3:00
| Las Vegas, Nevada, United States
| 
|-
| Win
| align=center| 3–1
| Yoshihiro Kitaoka
| TKO (punches)
| Xtreme Fighting League
| 
| align=center| 1
| align=center| 1:50
| Tulsa, Oklahoma, United States
| 
|-
| Win
| align=center| 2–1
| Erick Fernandez
| Submission (guillotine choke)
| CCCF: Contenders
| 
| align=center| 1
| align=center| 2:23
| Oklahoma City, Oklahoma, United States
| 
|-
| Win
| align=center| 1–1
| Ryan Winthers
| TKO (punches)
| HRP: Fight Night
| 
| align=center| 1
| align=center| 0:16
| Tulsa, Oklahoma, United States
| 
|-
| Loss
| align=center| 0–1
| Jake Pruitt
| TKO (punches)
| Masters of the Cage 16
| 
| align=center| 3
| align=center| 2:15
| Oklahoma City, Oklahoma, United States
|

References

External links

1979 births
Living people
People from Bixby, Oklahoma
People from Wagoner County, Oklahoma
American male mixed martial artists
Mixed martial artists from Oklahoma
Mixed martial artists utilizing collegiate wrestling
Ultimate Fighting Championship male fighters
American male sport wrestlers